Chrysomyxa is a genus of rust fungi in the family Coleosporiaceae. The genus, widespread in the Northern Hemisphere, contains about 23 species. Rust fungi in the genus Chrysomyxa occur in boreal forests of the northern hemisphere on Pinaceae, (mostly Picea), and most species alternate to angiosperm hosts in the Ericaceae.

Species
Chrysomyxa abietis
Chrysomyxa arctostaphyli
Chrysomyxa cassandrae
Chrysomyxa chiogenis
Chrysomyxa diebuensis
Chrysomyxa empetri
Chrysomyxa expansa
Chrysomyxa himalensis
Chrysomyxa ledi
Chrysomyxa ledicola
Chrysomyxa nagodhii
Chrysomyxa neoglandulosi
Chrysomyxa piperiana
Chrysomyxa pirolata
Chrysomyxa pyrolae
Chrysomyxa reticulata
Chrysomyxa rhododendri
Chrysomyxa roanensis
Chrysomyxa stilbae
Chrysomyxa succinea
Chrysomyxa vaccinii
Chrysomyxa weirii
Chrysomyxa woroninii
Chrysomyxa zhuoniensis

References

 
Taxa described in 1840